Burttdavya is a monotypic genus of flowering plants in the family Rubiaceae. It was described by Hoyle in 1936. The genus contains only one species, viz. Burttdavya nyasica, which is a tree found in Tanzania, Malawi, and Mozambique.

References

External links 
 Burttdavya in the World Checklist of Rubiaceae

Monotypic Rubiaceae genera
Naucleeae